Pseudoliva crassa is a species of sea snail, a marine gastropod mollusk in the family Pseudolividae.

Description

Distribution

References

Pseudolividae
Gastropods described in 1791